Law enforcement in Tanzania is primarily the responsibility of the Tanzania Police Force within 947,303 km2 (365,756 sq. mi) of national jurisdiction of Tanzania. The force, headed by the Ministry of Home Affairs, is divided into five departments. Each department is lead by a commissioner.

Administrative Divisions
Administration/Resource Management
Operations
Criminal Investigations
Dar es Salaam Special Police Zone
Zanzibar Police Force

Oversight
Oversight of the force is shared by the Principal Secretary of the Ministry of Police and the Inspector-General of Police. Both the principal secretary and the inspector-general conduct internal affairs by way of tribunals and other measures deemed appropriate.

References